Singapore National Academy of Science (SNAS) is a government funded body in Singapore founded in 1967 and re-purposed in 1976 when some functions were invested into the Singapore Association for the Advancement of Science (SAAS).

Since 2011, SNAS has begun to elect her own fellows.

References

External links
 https://snas.org.sg

National academies
Schools in Singapore
Members of the International Science Council